Cochamó is a Chilean town and commune located in Llanquihue Province, Los Lagos Region. The capital of the commune is the town of Río Puelo, which is named after the Puelo River.

History
This sprawling commune was established in 1979; its capital is the Rio Puelo community. Settlement in the area dates back to prehispanic times. Later, the town emerged from stages of consolidating permanent occupation of Cochamó. Recently, ecotourism has become a constantly growing activity in the area. The population of Cochamó is mostly of Spanish origin, with small numbers of Germans and Italians and one young Czech couple.

Demographics
The population grew by 0% (2 persons) between the 1992 and 2002 censuses.

Administration
As a commune, Cochamó is a third-level administrative division of Chile administered by a municipal council, headed by an alcalde who is directly elected every four years. The 2008-2012 alcalde is Carlos Soto Sotomayor (PRSD).

Within the electoral divisions of Chile, Cochamó is represented in the Chamber of Deputies by Marisol Turres (UDI) and Patricio Vallespín (PDC) as part of the 57th electoral district, together with Puerto Montt, Maullín and Calbuco. The commune is represented in the Senate by Camilo Escalona Medina (PS) and Carlos Kuschel Silva (RN) as part of the 17th senatorial constituency (Los Lagos Region).

Nearby Attractions
Nearby attractions include:
Cochamó Valley
Vicente Pérez Rosales National Park

References

External links

  Municipality of Cochamó
Cochamó Valley - La Junta information, logistics, accommodations, camping
Trekking information, logistics for Valle Cochamó - La Junta
Climbing routes and topos for Valle Cochamó - La Junta
Information and Tours in Cochamó
Organizacion de Turismo, Propietarios y Amigos del Valle Cochamó

Communes of Chile
Populated places in Llanquihue Province
1979 establishments in Chile
Coasts of Los Lagos Region